Suzunami may refer to: